The giant pangasius, paroon shark, pangasid-catfish or Chao Phraya giant catfish (Pangasius sanitwongsei) is a species of freshwater fish in the shark catfish family (Pangasiidae) of order Siluriformes, found in the Chao Phraya and Mekong basins in Indochina. Its populations have declined drastically, mainly due to overfishing, and it is now considered Critically Endangered.

Etymology
The specific name sanitwongsei was chosen to honor M. R. Suwaphan Sanitwong for his support of fisheries in Thailand.

Geographic range 
The species is native to the Mekong and Chao Phraya rivers. It has been introduced to central Anatolia, South Africa, and Malaysia.

Habitat 
The Pangasius sanitwongsei is tolerant in poor quality water and prefers to live in the bottom of deep depressions in freshwater rivers. The fish live in rivers but are experiencing endangerment due to dams being built, causing the fish to be trapped and unable to migrate.

Physical characteristics 

The giant pangasius is pigmented with dusky melanophores. It has a wide, flat, whiskerless head. Its body is compressed and elongate, with a depressed head. It has a continuous and uninterrupted single vomero-palatine teeth patch which is curved. The anal fin has 26 rays and the pectoral spine is similar in size to the dorsal spine and also shows serrations. It has a silver, curved underside and a dark brown back. Its dorsal, pectoral and pelvic fins are dark gray and the first soft ray is extended into a filament. Its dorsal, adipose, pectoral, and caudal fins are a dark grey to black coloring, with its anal fin and pelvic fins a white to grey coloring. More commonly the fish's length is around 2 meters.

Development 
This species reproduces sexually, and the eggs and sperm are usually released in a muddier area to prevent eggs from sticking to each other. The number of eggs per each spawning is around 600 (with a diameter of 2-2.5mm) and the brood shows low genetic variation. There is no parental care after spawning.

Behavior 
The giant pangasius is a benthopelagic and migratory species. Juveniles and adults feed on crustaceans and fishes. These fish typically spawn just prior to the monsoon season. It is believed that the P. sanitwongsei prey on shrimp, crabs, and fish and hideout in deep areas in rivers. The P. sanitwongsei have a seasonal migration but the fish does not leave the river during its migration, it only stays within the river during the seasonal migration.

Food habits 
The P. sanitwongsei is a carnivorous fish, whose prey consist of shrimp, crabs, and fish. Since the fish lives on the bottom, it is also known to feed on larger animals' carcasses.

Predation 
There are no known natural predators of the P. sanitwongsei, besides humans due to overfishing which is leading to a decline in population.

Reproduction 
Little is known of the reproduction of P. sanitwongsei, but the time of spawning happens in the months of April and May. It is predicted that spawning happens in the rivers that they are found and are not believed to be migrating from outside the river when getting ready to spawn.

Longevity 
This fish's lifespan isn't known, but it is known that it grows fast and usually the trend is when it grows fast, it dies quickly. The possible reasoning for this could be the fact that there is over-fishing of the species.

Ecosystem roles 
The P. sanitwongsei's role in the ecosystem is the top predator, or also known as the "umbrella" species for the other species that live in the habitat. Due to overharvesting, the native fish population may increase since the P. sanitwongsei population is declining.

Economic importance 
This fish is important to humans due to the lack of knowledge we have about it, and this fish can show us migratory pathways and spawning habits. This fish also has an important role in fisheries since they are fast growing and can live in poor water environments, plus they bring in good prices for a fish of this fish

Relationship to humans 
Fishing of this species used to be accompanied by religious ceremonies and rites. It is often mentioned in textbooks, news media, and popular press. This fish is a popular food fish and marketed fresh, They are introduced to Malaysia for both food and ornamental fish.

These fish sometimes appear in the aquarium fish hobby. Most specimens do not reach their full size without an extremely large aquarium or pond. There is even a "balloon" form of this fish where the fish has an unusually short and stocky body.

Conservation status 
This fish is highly protected and has a high conservation value and is banned from being fished through all seasons. The fish is being threatened by overharvesting, damming rivers, and pollution. A known breeding practice, to try and help the population, is being practiced by the Thai's government, and recommendations about the conservation of this fish is to halt harvesting until the P. sanitwongsei's population can rise to a safe level.

See also
List of freshwater aquarium fish species

References

Pangasiidae
Freshwater fish of Southeast Asia
Fish of Thailand
Fish described in 1931